Michael Anthony Claudio  Wincott (born January 21, 1958) is a Canadian actor. His deep, raspy voice has often led to his being cast in villainous roles.

Some of his best-known roles include Guy of Gisborne in Robin Hood: Prince of Thieves (1991); Top Dollar, the main antagonist in The Crow (1994); music mogul Philo Gant in Strange Days (1995); mercenary Frank Elgyn in Alien: Resurrection (1997); hacker Adrian Cross on the TV miniseries 24: Live Another Day (2014); and cinematographer Antlers Holst in Nope (2022).

Early life and education
Wincott was born in Toronto and grew up in an east end suburb. His father is English while his mother was from Piacenza, Italy.  Wincott also has two brothers, one of whom is actor and martial artist Jeff Wincott, a star of the late 80s TV series Night Heat.

In a 2014 interview with L'Uomo Vogue (the Italian edition of Men's Vogue) Wincott said he fell in love with cinema as a young child and took drama classes in High School. He was educated at the Victoria University, a college of the University of Toronto then in 1982 he enrolled at the Juilliard School in New York City, graduating in 1986. Wincott credited director Des McAnuff, as well as his father, with encouraging him to enroll at the prestigious acting school.

Career
In 1976, Wincott starred in his first film, titled Earthbound, as Cole Buckley, a troubled teenager living in a small Saskatchewan town. Actors Kate Reid and Gerard Parkes played his parents in the film. The film aired on CBC-TV's Front Row Centre series in January 1977.

In 1979 Wincott starred in the Canadian adventure drama film Wild Horse Hank alongside Linda Blair. In 1981 he appeared in the Canadian drama film Circle of Two starring Richard Burton. He also appeared on two episodes of the Canadian TV Series The Littlest Hobo in 1979 and 1981.

After graduating from Juilliard, Wincott was cast in the 1987 film The Sicilian in the role of Corporal Silvestro Canio. That same year he was also cast in the Eric Bogosian play Talk Radio as a stoned heavy metal fan named Kent.  The following year Wincott appeared in Oliver Stone's film based on the play. In the 1980s he also appeared on such American TV series as Miami Vice, Crime Story and The Equalizer, as well as Canadian police drama series Night Heat—a series starring his brother Jeff.

Wincott's stage performances include the off-Broadway productions Road (1988) starring Joan Cusack and Kevin Bacon, and the Sam Shepard play States of Shock (1991) starring John Malkovich. He also appeared on Broadway starring in the play Serious Money (1988) alongside Kate Nelligan, Alec Baldwin and John Pankow, as well as appearing in The Secret Rapture (1989) starring Blair Brown.

Wincott again worked with Oliver Stone in 1989, appearing in the film Born on the Fourth of July as a bedridden Vietnam veteran, then yet again in 1991 in the film The Doors where he played the role of Paul Rothchild, the producer of The Doors' first five albums. In 1991 he also played the part of Guy of Gisborne in Robin Hood: Prince of Thieves, a henchman of the Sheriff of Nottingham (Alan Rickman) who is also the Sheriff's cousin in the film.
 
In 1993 he appeared in the film Romeo Is Bleeding as Sal, a mafioso, and also played the part of Rochefort in the Disney film The Three Musketeers starring Kiefer Sutherland, Charlie Sheen and Chris O'Donnell.  The following year Wincott starred as kingpin Top Dollar opposite Brandon Lee in The Crow. In 1995 he appeared in Dead Man with Johnny Depp. He played poet Rene Ricard in the 1996 biographical film Basquiat. He also played the role of mercenary Frank Elgyn in the 1997 film Alien Resurrection.

Wincott starred as a psychopathic kidnapper opposite Morgan Freeman in the 2001 film Along Came a Spider. The following year he played Armand Dorleac, a sadistic prison warden in the 2002 film version of The Count of Monte Cristo starring Jim Caviezel. In 2004 he played Julius Bicke, the brother of Samuel J. Bicke (played by Sean Penn) in The Assassination of Richard Nixon.  In 2006 Wincott appeared in the western film Seraphim Falls starring Pierce Brosnan and Liam Neeson. He also appeared in The Diving Bell and the Butterfly and What Just Happened in 2007 and 2008 respectively.

In 2009 he starred in A Lonely Place for Dying as CIA project manager Anthony Greenglass. In early 2012 he was cast as notorious serial killer Ed Gein in the biographical drama film Hitchcock.

In 2014 Wincott played hacker Adrian Cross in the miniseries 24: Live Another Day. The following year he starred in the Canadian western drama film Forsaken alongside Kiefer and Donald Sutherland. In 2016 he also played the role of Old Bill in two episodes in season 1 of the science fiction western TV series Westworld.

In 2017 he appeared in the MTG drama series Veni Vidi Vici. The Swedish series stars Danish actor Thomas Bo Larsen and centers around the porn industry. Wincott plays the part of Georgina, a transgender former porn director. The show was selected as one of the top new European series at the MIPDrama Screenings held annually in Cannes. The series was also streamed on Hulu in 2017. Wincott starred in Jordan Peele's 2022 thriller, Nope, as Antlers Holst, a renowned cinematographer. In preparation for the role, Wincott shadowed the film's director of photography, Hoyte van Hoytema.

Wincott has also lent his voice to several characters in video games and animated features: In 2002 he provided the voice of Scroop, a malevolent spider/crab-like creature in the Disney animated film Treasure Planet; he also provided the voice of Scroop in the accompanying Sony PlayStation video game of the same name. In 2004 he provided the voice for the Prophet of Truth in the video game Halo 2. He also provided the voice of Mr. Big in the 2005 re-launch of the video game Narc. In 2012 he provided the voices for several video game characters: Jules Merit in the game Syndicate, Griffin in the interactive graphic novel Infex, and Death in the game Darksiders II.

Filmography

Film

Television

Self

YouTube videos

Short film

Video shorts
 The Treasure Planet Read Along DVD (2003) - Scroop (voice)

Thanks
 The Iceman Movie (2012) - (special thanks)

Video games

Theatre
 1987 - Talk Radio - Kent
 1988 - Serious Money - Grevett, Frosby, Jake Todd
 1988 - Road - Eddy, DJ, Skin Lad
 1989 - The Secret Rapture - Irwin Posner
 1991 - State of Shock - Stubbs

References

External links
 
 

1958 births
20th-century Canadian male actors
21st-century Canadian male actors
Living people
Canadian male film actors
Canadian male video game actors
Canadian male voice actors
Canadian male stage actors
Canadian male television actors
Canadian people of English descent
Canadian people of Italian descent
Juilliard School alumni
Male actors from Toronto